Miss Teen USA 2014, the 32nd Miss Teen USA pageant. It was held at the Atlantis Paradise Island Resort in Nassau, Bahamas on August 2, 2014 and was hosted by Australian journalist Karl Jeno Schmid and Miss USA 2013 Erin Brady. Cassidy Wolf of California crowned her successor K. Lee Graham of South Carolina at the end of the event.

Results

Placements

Special Awards

Historical significance 
 South Carolina wins competition for the second time.
 Mississippi earns the 1st runner-up position for the first time. 
 Pennsylvania earns the 2nd runner-up position for the second time. The last time it was placed in 1993.
 California earns the 3rd runner-up position for the first time.
 New Jersey earns the 4th runner-up position for the second time. The last time it was placed in 2003.
 States that placed in semifinals the previous year were California, New Jersey, South Carolina, Tennessee, West Virginia and Wisconsin.
 South Carolina and West Virginia placed for the fourth consecutive year. 
 California, New Jersey, Tennessee and Wisconsin made their second consecutive placement.
 Michigan and Oklahoma last placed in 2012.
 Indiana, Pennsylvania and Texas last placed in 2011.
 Mississippi last placed in 2010.
 Arizona and Massachusetts last placed in 2008.
 Delaware last placed in 1999.
 Georgia and Kansas break an ongoing streak of placements since 2011.
 Alabama, Hawaii and New York break an ongoing streak of placements since 2012.

Pageant

Selection of contestants
One delegate from each state and the District of Columbia was chosen in state pageants held from September 2013 to January 2014.
 
The date was announced on April 2, 2014 by each delegate, which was officially confirmed shortly thereafter.

Preliminary round
Prior to the final telecast, the delegates competed in the preliminary competition, which involves private interviews with the judges and a presentation show where they compete in swimsuit and evening gown. The preliminary competition took place on August 1, 2014.

Finals
During the final competition, the top fifteen competed in swimsuit and evening gown, and the top five competed in the final question signed up by a panel of judges.

Judges
Amber Katz
Christielle Lim
Fred Nelson
Joe Parisi
Mallory Tucker

Contestants

Availability
While the webcast was available worldwide via the Miss Teen USA website/YouTube, Xbox Live's broadcast of the pageant was only available in the following countries:

1Commentary from Rashel Diaz and Raúl González of Telemundo
2Subtitled
3Commentary from Sérgio Marone and Debora Lyra

References

External links
 Miss Teen USA official website

2014
2014 beauty pageants
2014 in the United States
2014 in the Bahamas